John Solomon Rarey (1827–1866) was a nineteenth-century horse whisperer, an important figure in the rehabilitation of abused and vicious horses during the 1850s. Originally from Groveport, Ohio, Rarey trained his first horse at the age of twelve. (His method of rehabilitating horses is discussed in the article entitled Rarey technique.)

An excerpt from The Horse Whisperer by Nicholas Evans:

The horse they found was Cruiser, an animal kept for breeding but said to be the fiercest horse ever seen.

Nicholas Evans writes:

Rarey used Cruiser in three well-attended public demonstrations of horse-taming in New York City in early January 1861.

Works
John Solomon Rarey, The Complete Horse Tamer, 1862.

References

External links
 

Official Website – Maintained by his descendants, this site includes information about him as well as the complete text of his book, The Complete Horse Tamer.
 
 
 

Natural horsemanship
1827 births
1866 deaths
People from Groveport, Ohio